"Pictures in the Mirror" is a song by Australian punk rock band The Living End. It was released on 16 October 2000, as the first single from their second album, Roll On. It reached number 18 on the ARIA Singles Chart.

Track listing

References

2000 singles
The Living End songs
2000 songs
EMI Records singles
Song recordings produced by Nick Launay
Songs written by Chris Cheney